The Battle of Lake George was fought on 8 September 1755, in the north of the Province of New York. It was part of a campaign by the British to expel the French from North America, in the French and Indian War.

On one side were 1,584 French, Canadian, and Abenaki troops under the command of the Baron de Dieskau. On the other side were 2,682 colonial troops under William Johnson and 250 Mohawks led by noted war chief Hendrick Theyanoguin. The battle consisted of three separate phases and ended in victory for the British and their allies. After the battle, Johnson decided to build Fort William Henry in order to consolidate his gains.

Background 
William Johnson – who had recently been named the British agent to the Iroquois – arrived at the southern end of Lac du Saint Sacrement on 28 August 1755, and renamed it "Lake George" in honor of his sovereign, George II. His intention was to advance via Lake George and Lake Champlain to attack French-held Fort St. Frédéric at Crown Point, which was a keystone in the defense of Canada.

With a view to stopping Johnson's advance, Dieskau had already left Crown Point for an encampment situated between the two lakes (later to be built into Fort Carillon, the precursor of Fort Ticonderoga.) On 4 September, Dieskau decided to launch a raid on Johnson's base, the recently constructed Fort Edward (at the time called "Fort Lyman") on the Hudson River. His aim was to destroy the boats, supplies and artillery that Johnson needed for his campaign. Leaving half his force at Carillon, Dieskau led the rest on an alternate route to the Hudson by landing his men at South Bay and then marching them east of Lake George along Wood Creek. Dieskau arrived near Fort Edward on the evening of 7 September, with 222 French regular grenadiers from the Régiment de la Reine and the Régiment de Languedoc, 684 Canadian militia, 578 Abenaki and Nipissing allies.

However, the messenger was intercepted, and soon afterward a supply train was captured. As a result, the disposition of all of Johnson's forces became known to Dieskau. The Abenaki Indians in the French party, after holding council, declined to assault Fort Edward because they expected it to be defended with cannons; so in the morning, Dieskau gave the order to march north toward the lake.

At 9:00 a.m. on 8 September, Johnson sent Colonel Ephraim Williams south to reinforce Fort Edward with 250 Mohawk allies and 1,000 troops from Williams' Massachusetts Regiment and Colonel Nathan Whiting's Connecticut Regiment. Dieskau, warned by a deserter of Williams' approach, blocked the portage road with his French grenadiers and sent his Canadians and Indians to ambush the British from both sides of the road. They lay in wait in a ravine three miles south of the present-day village of Lake George.

Order of Battle

British Order of Battle 
Commander: Major-General William Johnson
 Provincial (2,932 effective men as per the returns of August 17, 18 and 19)
 1st Massachusetts Provincials (about 450 men) under Colonel Timothy Ruggles
 2nd Massachusetts Provincials (about 450 men) under Colonel Moses Titcomb
 3rd Massachusetts Provincials (about 450 men) under Colonel Ephraim Williams
 1st Connecticut Provincials (about 450 men) under Major-General Lyman
 2nd Connecticut Provincials (about 450 men) under Lieutenant-Colonel Whiting
 Rhode Island Provincials (about 250 men) under Lieutenant-Colonel Cole
 New York Provincials (3 coys from Connecticut totaling about 200 men) many settlers in upstate New York came from Connecticut
 Mohawk Indians (about 250 men) under Hendrick Theyanoguin

French Order of Battle 
Commander: Général de Division Ludwig August, Baron von Dieskau
 French regulars (222 men)
 Languedoc Infanterie (2 coys)
 La Reine Infanterie (2 coys)
 Troupes de la Marine (12 men)
 Milices Canadiennes (684 men)
 Abenaki Warriors (598 men)
 Nipissing Warriors (80 men)

Battle

"Bloody Morning Scout" 

Williams' column marched straight into the trap and was engulfed in a blaze of enemy musketry. In an engagement known as the "Bloody Morning Scout", Williams and Hendrick were killed along with many of their troops. At this point, the French regulars, brought forward by Dieskau, poured volleys into the beleaguered colonial troops. Most of the New Englanders fled toward Johnson's camp while about 100 of their comrades under Whiting and Lt. Col. Seth Pomeroy and most of the surviving Mohawks covered their withdrawal with a fighting retreat. The British rearguard was able to inflict substantial casualties on their overconfident pursuers. Pomeroy noted that his men "killed great numbers of them; they were seen to drop like pigeons". One of those killed in this phase of the battle was Jacques Legardeur de Saint-Pierre, the highly respected commander of Dieskau's Canadian and Indian forces. His fall caused great dismay, particularly to the French Indians.

Assault on Johnson's camp 

Dieskau ordered his Canadians and Indians to follow up their success with an attack on Johnson's camp. However, with their morale already shaken by the loss of their leader, the Caughnawagas "did not wish to attack an entrenched camp, the defenders of which included hundreds of their Mohawk kinsmen. The Abenakis would not go forward without the Caughnawagas, and neither would the Canadians". Hoping to shame the Indians into attacking, Dieskau formed his 222 French grenadiers into a column, six abreast, and led them in person along the lake road. The grenadiers marched toward the clearing where Johnson's camp was, around which Johnson had hurriedly constructed defensive barricades of "wagons, overturned boats and hewn-down trees". Once the grenadiers were out in the open ground, the British gunners crewing Johnson's three cannons loaded them with grapeshot and cut "lanes, streets and alleys" through the French ranks. When Johnson was wounded and forced to retire to his tent for treatment, General Phineas Lyman took over command. When Dieskau went down with a serious wound, the French attack was abandoned.

After the French withdrawal, the British found about 20 severely wounded Frenchmen who were lying too close to the British artillery's field of fire for their comrades to retrieve them. They included Baron Dieskau, who had paid the price of leading from the front with a shot through the bladder. (Benjamin West painted a portrait of Johnson saving a French officer—allegedly Baron Dieskau.)

Bloody Pond 

Meanwhile, Colonel Joseph Blanchard, commander of Fort Edward, saw the smoke from the battle in the distance and sent out Nathaniel Folsom's 80-strong company of the New Hampshire Provincial Regiment and 40 New York Provincials under Captain McGennis to investigate.

Hearing the report of guns in the direction of the Lake, they pressed forward, and when within about two miles of it, fell in with the baggage of the French army protected by a guard, which they immediately attacked and dispersed. About four o'clock in the afternoon, some 300 of the French army appeared in sight. They had rallied, and retreating in tolerable order. Capt. Folsom posted his men among the trees, and as the enemy approached, they poured in upon them a well directed and galling fire. He continued the attack in this manner till prevented by darkness, killing many of the enemy, taking some of them prisoners, and finally driving them from the field. He then collected his own wounded, and securing them with many of the enemy's packs, he brought his prisoners and booty safe into camp. The next day the rest of the baggage was brought in, thus securing the entire baggage and ammunition of the French army. In this brilliant affair, Folsom lost only six men, but McGennis was mortally wounded, and died soon after. The loss of the French was very considerable.

The bodies of the French troops who were killed in this engagement (actually Canada-born French colonials and their Native American allies, not French regulars) were thrown into the pool "which bears to this day the name of Bloody Pond".

Aftermath 

The Battle of Lake George, comprising three parts, eventually ended in a British victory. Johnson's expedition eventually stopped short of Fort St. Frédéric and the strategic result at Lake George was significant. Johnson was able to advance a considerable distance down the lake and consolidated his gains by building Fort William Henry at its southern end. Historian Fred Anderson writes that had Dieskau succeeded in halting Johnson at Fort Edward, it would have not only ended the threat to Fort St. Frédéric but would also "roll back New York's and New England's defenses to Albany itself".

Casualties 
There are as many different versions of the casualties suffered at Lake George as there are accounts of the battle.

A letter of 20 October 1755, from Monsieur Doreil to the Comte d'Argenson, a senior French commander in North America, confirms that the French grenadiers paid for their assault on Johnson's entrenchments with the loss of more than a third of their total strength: the Regiment de la Reine had 21 killed or missing and 30 wounded, while the Regiment de Languedoc had 5 killed and 21 wounded.

Peter Palmer states in his history that "the loss of the English this day was about two hundred and sixteen killed and ninety-six wounded; of the French the loss was much greater." He claims Johnson estimated the French loss at five to six hundred, while stating that another source noted it as "a little short of eight hundred".

W. Max Reid says, "The English loss in killed, wounded, and missing at the battle of Lake George was 262, and that of the French, by their own account, was 228".

Ian K. Steele says of the British losses, "The official returns, corrected, read 154 dead, 103 wounded, and 67 missing. Most of those listed as missing had not deserted into woods full of Canadians and Indians; most of the missing were later found dead. Pomeroy was preoccupied with the losses, but overlooked the Iroquois casualties, which brought the totals to 223 dead and about 108 wounded".

Of the French losses, Steele says, "The official French journal of the operation probably minimized Indian casualties in a total count of 149 dead, 163 wounded, and 27 taken prisoner. The reported number of those killed, wounded, and captured was remarkably close on both sides, with those fighting for the English losing 331 and the French, 339." Steele does not give a reason for his suspicion that the Indian casualties were under-reported.

In his 2009 book, Combattre pour la France en Amérique, Marcel Fournier diverges considerably from the other sources in reporting the casualties for the Battle of Lac St-Sacrement (as the French called it) at 800 killed or wounded for the British and 200 killed or wounded for the French.

Map gallery

See also
 Battle of Lake Champlain
 Thomas Johnston - engraver of first historical print in America, A prospective plan of the battle fought near Lake George on the 8th of September 1755.
 Lake George Battlefield Park Historic District

References

Further reading 
 Harrison, Bird (1962). Navies in the Mountains: The Battles on the Waters of Lake Champlain and Lake George, 1609–1814. Oxford University Press, p. 361.
 Griffith, William R. The Battle of Lake George: England's First Triumph in the French and Indian War. Charleston, SC: The History Press, 2016.

External links 
 America’s Historic Lakes

Lake George
1755 in North America
Lake George, Battle of
Pre-statehood history of New Hampshire
Pre-statehood history of Massachusetts
Pre-statehood history of Connecticut
Pre-statehood history of New York (state)
Lake George
Lake George
Lake George
1755 in the Province of New York
Ambushes